Bevyn Baker (born 8 August 1937) is an Australian former long jumper who competed in the 1960 Summer Olympics.

References

1937 births
Living people
Australian male long jumpers
Olympic athletes of Australia
Athletes (track and field) at the 1960 Summer Olympics